The Birmingham Metalheads are an English baseball club based in Marston Green, situated in the West Midlands region of England.

History

Founded in 2003 by a local enthusiast, the team was originally named the Birmingham Maple Leafs. This was an homage to the members of the Royal Canadian Army Medical Corps who were based at No.7 Canadian General Hospital in Marston Green, and took up baseball as recreation.

The club changed its name to the Birmingham Bandits in 2014 and competed at both AA and AAA levels within the British baseball system.

The club changed its name again in 2020, with the team becoming the Birmingham Metalheads, referencing the musical heritage of the region.

Ballpark

The Metalheads play their home games at Purplebricks Field at Marston Green Recreation Ground.

Season by season record

References

External links
Birmingham Baseball website

Baseball teams in England
Sport in Birmingham, West Midlands
Baseball teams in the United Kingdom